Remedy for Riches is a 1940 American film directed by Erle C. Kenton and featuring Jean Hersholt. It is the fourth of the six films of the Dr. Christian series.

Plot 

A college friend of the local soda-jerk comes to town and lets it be known that he's looking for property on which to build a resort. When he buys some land and suddenly "discovers" there's oil underneath it—and generously offers to sell the townspeople shares in his newly found oil reserves—Dr. Christian suspects a swindle and sets out to prove it.

Cast 

 Jean Hersholt as Dr. Paul Christian
 Dorothy Lovett as Judy Price
 Edgar Kennedy as George Browning
 Maude Eburne as Mrs. Hastings
 Walter Catlett as Clem
 Robert Baldwin as Roy Davis
 Warren Hull as Tom Stewart
 Jed Prouty as D.B. Emerson Vanderveer
 Renie Riano as Mrs. Gattle

References

External links 
 

1940 films
1940 comedy films
American comedy films
American black-and-white films
Films directed by Erle C. Kenton
1940s American films
Dr. Christian films